The Hybrid electric double layer (Hybrid EDL) is a model to describe the formation of electric double layer considering the contribution of electron transfer at liquid-solid interface, which is firstly proposed by Wang et al. in 2018.The major difference between the hybrid EDL model and the traditional EDL model is that the hybrid EDL model considers that there are both electrons and ions on the solid surface in the EDL, while the traditional EDL model considers that the solid surface has only adsorbed ions.

Nomenclature 
The Hybrid EDL is also named after Prof. Zhong Lin Wang (Wang model), who proposed it in 2018.

The "two-step" formation process 

The formation of the Hybrid EDL can be described by the "two-step" processes. In the first step, the molecules and ions in the liquid impact the solid surface due to the thermal motion and the pressure from the liquid, while the overlap of the electron clouds of the solid atoms and water molecules leads to the electron transfer between them. Then, due to liquid flow or turbulence, the liquid molecules that are adjacent to the solid surface can be pushed off of the interface.

Experimental evidence 
The key difference between the Hybrid EDL model and traditional EDL model is whether the electron transfer at liquid-solid interface exists. The electron transfer was verified experimentally at both nano-scale and macro-scale. At nanoscale, it was found that the charges on the solid surface generated by contacting with the liquid can be removed by heating, and the decay of the surface charge density consistent with the thermionic emission theory, suggesting the existence of the electron transfer at liquid-solid interface. At macroscale, it was noticed that the amount of transferred charge on the solid surface is much greater than the number of ions in the liquid that may by adsorbed to the surface, which also implies that the electron transfer play a dominant role in liquid-solid contact electrification (CE).

The solid surface charge density in EDL 
In the Hybrid EDL, the surface charge density (electrons and ions) in the liquid-solid CE is not as dense as that appearing in text book drawing. For example, the experiments suggest that highest transferred electron density is −630 mCm−2 in the CE between SiO2 and DI water,.

References 

Surfaces
Capacitors